Epigomphus clavatus is a species of dragonfly in the family Gomphidae. It is endemic to Guatemala.  Its natural habitats are subtropical or tropical moist montane forests and rivers. It is threatened by habitat loss.

References

Endemic fauna of Guatemala
Gomphidae
Insects of Central America
Taxonomy articles created by Polbot
Insects described in 1980